The Southern Collegiate Hockey Conference is a collegiate hockey conference within Division II of the College Hockey Federation. All teams within the conference come from universities based in the state of Florida.

History 
The SCHC began play in the 2014–15 season. For the first two seasons, the conference was composed of five teams from Florida. Prior to the start of the 2016–17 season, the conference added the University of Miami as the sixth member of the conference. The 2016–17 season has each of the six member schools playing each other twice during the regular season. In 2018–2019 the conference added Embry-Riddle Aeronautical University as its sixth member after Florida Atlantic University left the conference. In 2020 the SCHC announced its plan to affiliate with the College Hockey Federation in 2020-2021. As a result Florida Gulf Coast University announced its departure from the conference to stay in the American Collegiate Hockey Association.

Members

Former members

Membership timeline

Conference champions

References

Ice hockey leagues in the United States
Sports in Florida